The 2008–09 Montenegrin First League was the third season of the top-tier football in Montenegro. The season began on 9 August 2008 and ended on 30 May 2009. The defending champions are Budućnost Podgorica.

Teams
Mladost Podgorica were directly relegated to the Montenegrin Second League after finishing 12th in last year's standings. Their place was taken by Second League champions Jezero Plav.

10th placed Bokelj Kotor and 11th placed Sutjeska Nikšić had to compete in two-legged relegation play-offs. Bokelj were relegated by losing 1–0 on aggregate against the 3rd placed team from Second League, Jedinstvo Bijelo Polje. On the other hand, Sutjeska saved their place in Montenegrin top league by beating cross-town rivals Čelik Nikšić, who had finished in 2nd place in the Second League, also with 1–0 on aggregate.

Stadia and locations

League table

Results
The schedule consists of three rounds. During the first two rounds, each team played each other once home and away for a total of 22 matches. The pairings of the third round will then be set according to the standings after the first two rounds, giving every team a third game against each opponent for a total of 33 games per team.

First and second round

Third round
Key numbers for pairing determination (number marks position after 22 games):

Relegation play-offs
The 10th placed team (against the 3rd placed team of the Second League) and the 11th placed team (against the 2nd placed team of the Second League) will both compete in two-legged relegation play-offs after the end of the season.

Summary

Matches

Dečić won 3–0 on aggregate.

Mornar won 2–1 on aggregate.

Top goalscorers

Source:

References

Montenegrin First League seasons
Monte
1